Verica (early 1st century AD) was a British client king of the Roman Empire in the years preceding the Claudian invasion of 43 AD.

From his coinage, he appears to have been king of the, probably Belgic, Atrebates tribe and a son of Commius. The distribution of his coins also shows that Verica's kingdom was centred on modern Sussex and east Hampshire, and its capital would have been in or close to what became the Roman Noviomagus Reginorum (modern Chichester). He succeeded his elder brother Eppillus as king in about 15 AD, and may also have reigned over the northern Atrebatic kingdom at Calleva Atrebatum, today called Silchester. He was recognised as rex by Rome and appears to have had friendly trade and diplomatic links with the empire.

His territory was pressed from the east by the Catuvellauni, led by Epaticcus, brother of Cunobelinus, who conquered Calleva in about 25 AD. After Epaticcus's death ca. 35 AD Verica regained some territory, but Cunobelinus's son Caratacus took over and conquered the entire kingdom some time after 40 AD.  According to Welcher, by 42AD when Verica was expelled, his kingdom had been reduced to a core area around Chichester and the Manhood peninsula, perhaps contained within the dykes of the Chichester entrenchments.

Dio Cassius records that "Bericus" (almost certainly Verica) was expelled from Britain around this time during a revolt. Suetonius refers to demands by the Britons that Rome return "certain deserters". As rex, Verica was nominally an ally of Rome, so his exile gave Claudius an excuse to begin his invasion.

Verica's relationship with Rome has been used to argue for the site of the Roman invasion of Britain as being along the south coast to assist him, rather than being at the traditional spot at Richborough in Kent.  Verica's southern Atrebatic kingdom of what is now Sussex and east Hampshire, had maintained a good relationship with Rome for many years.  Verica is likely to have been seen by the Romans as an ally and a counter-balance to the powerful Catuvellaunian tribe to the north.  This may have led to Roman military intervention to support Verica against the Catuvellauni who were becoming a threat to the Roman Empire's north-west frontier.  Unlike other nearby areas, the hillforts in the core of Verica's kingdom show no sign of refortification and show the apparently pro-Roman attitude of the area's inhabitants.

After the invasion, Verica may have been restored as king, but this is not attested in the historical or archaeological record. In any case a new ruler for the region, Cogidubnus, soon appeared. Cogidubnus may have been an heir of Verica who by this time would have been very old indeed.

Bibliography

References

External links
Atrebates at Roman-Britain.co.uk
Atrebates at Romans in Britain
Coinage of Verica at The Celtic Coin Index

Briton rulers
Celtic warriors
1st-century monarchs in Europe